Claudio Corioni (born 26 December 1982 in Chiari) is an Italian former professional road bicycle racer.

Major results

 Setmana Catalana de Ciclisme – 1 stage & Points Competition (2005)
 Giro del Belvedere (2004)
 Milano-Busseto (2003)
 Settimana internazionale di Coppi e Bartali – Stage 2 (2011)

External links 

1982 births
Living people
Italian male cyclists
Cyclists from the Province of Brescia